Dodoma Urban District (or Dodoma Municipal Council) is one of the seven districts of the Dodoma Region of Tanzania. It is bordered to the west by Bahi District, and to the east by Chamwino District. Its administrative seat is the city of Dodoma, also the legislative capital of Tanzania.

In 2016 the Tanzania National Bureau of Statistics report there were 446,640 people in the district, from 410,956 in 2012.

Transport

Road 
Paved trunk road T3 from Morogoro to Singida and paved trunk road T5 from Iringa to Babati pass through the district.

Train 
The central railway of Tanzania passes through Dodoma Urban District as well and there is a train station in Dodoma.

Airport 
Dodoma Airport is located within Dododa Urban District as well.

Administrative subdivisions 
As of 2012, Dodoma Urban District was administratively divided into 41 wards.

Wards 

 Chahwa
 Chamwino
 Chang'ombe Dodoma
 Chigongwe
 Chihanga
 Dodoma Makulu
 Hazina
 Hombolo Makulu
 Hombolo Bwawani
 Ihumwa
 Ipagala
 Ipala
 Iyumbu
 Kikombo
 Kikuyu Kaskazini
 Kikuyu Kusini
 Kilimani
 Kiwanja cha ndege
 Kizota
 Madukani
 Majengo
 Makole
 Makutupora
 Matumbulu
 Mbabala
 Mbalawala
 Miyuji
 Mkonze
 Mnadani
 Mpunguzi
 Msalato
 Mtumba
 Nala
 Ngh'ongh'onha
 Nkuhungu
 Ntyuka
 Nzuguni
 Tambukareli
 Uhuru
 Viwandani
 Zuzu

References 

Districts of Dodoma Region